Dessalines can refer to:

 Jean-Jacques Dessalines, a general and statesman of Haiti.
 La Dessalinienne, the national anthem of Haiti named in his honor.
 Arrondissement of Dessalines, a Haitian arrondissement in the Artibonite Department
 Dessalines, a town in the arrondissement of the same name
 Alcide Dessalines d'Orbigny, a French naturalist.